Sultan Dziaddin Mukarram Shah I ibni Almarhum Sultan Muhyiddin Mansur Shah (died 1 May 1688; also spelt Sultan Ziyauddin Mukarram Shah I or Sultan Dhiauddin Mukarram Shah I) was the 15th Sultan of Kedah. His reign was from 1662 to 1688. He established his capital at Wai, in Perlis, which he named Kota Indira Kayangan in August 1664. He accepted Siamese suzerainty and dispatched the first "Bunga Mas" in January 1674.

External links
 List of Sultans of Kedah 

17th-century Sultans of Kedah
1688 deaths